Halaf may refer to:
 Halaf 1
 Halaf 2
 Halaf 3